The 1973 Memphis State Tigers football team represented Memphis State University (now known as the University of Memphis) as an independent during the 1973 NCAA Division I football season. In its second season under head coach Fred Pancoast, the team compiled an 8–3 record and outscored opponents by a total of 264 to 167. The team played its home games at Memphis Memorial Stadium in Memphis, Tennessee. 

The team's statistical leaders included David Fowler with 759 passing yards, Dornell Harris with 564 rushing yards, Bobby Ward with 744 receiving yards, and Bobby Ward and Cliff Taylor with 42 points scored each.

Schedule

References

Memphis State
Memphis Tigers football seasons
Memphis State Tigers football